Wýaçeslaw Nikolaýewiç Krendelew (born 24 July 1982) is a Russian-Turkmenistani footballer. Now coach at ZFK CSKA Moscow.

Career

Krendelyov signed for the Russian Premier League outfit FC Amkar Perm in 2008, but failed to break into the first team and spent the whole season playing for the reserves. He was loaned to Russian First Division's FC Metallurg Lipetsk in the following year.

Career statistics

Club

International

Statistics accurate as of match played 23 July 2011

International Goals

References

External links
  Profile at stats.sportbox.ru

1982 births
Sportspeople from Ashgabat
Living people
Turkmenistan footballers
Turkmenistan expatriate footballers
Turkmenistan international footballers
Turkmenistan people of Russian descent
2004 AFC Asian Cup players
Expatriate footballers in Russia
Turkmenistan expatriate sportspeople in Russia
FC Nisa Aşgabat players
FC Metallurg Lipetsk players
Expatriate footballers in Kazakhstan
FC Taraz players
FC Akhmat Grozny players
FC Baltika Kaliningrad players
Turkmenistan expatriate sportspeople in Kazakhstan
FC Luch Vladivostok players
FC SKA-Khabarovsk players
Association football midfielders
Association football forwards
FC Amkar Perm players